1615 Bardwell, provisional designation , is a rare-type Themistian asteroid from the outer region of the asteroid belt, approximately 27 kilometers in diameter. It was discovered on 28 January 1950, by IU's Indiana Asteroid Program at Goethe Link Observatory near Brooklyn, Indiana, United States. It is named for American astronomer Conrad Bardwell.

Orbit and classification 

Bardwell is a member of the Themis family, a dynamical family of outer-belt asteroids with nearly coplanar ecliptical orbits. It orbits the Sun at a distance of 2.6–3.7 AU once every 5 years and 6 months (2,020 days). Its orbit has an eccentricity of 0.18 and an inclination of 2° with respect to the ecliptic.

Its orbit has an eccentricity of 0.18 and an inclination of 2° with respect to the ecliptic.

Naming 

This minor planet was named for Conrad M. Bardwell (1926–2010), who was a research associate at the Cincinnati Observatory and later associate director of the Minor Planet Center in Cambridge, Massachusetts, United States. Bardwell successfully established numerous identifications from observations in widely separated oppositions and provided observers with reliable data of orbital elements. The official  was published by the Minor Planet Center on 15 June 1974.

Physical characteristics 

In the Tholen taxonomy, Bardwell is a blueish B-type asteroid, a rare subtype of the abundant carbonaceous C-types found in the outer belt. The spectra of B-type bodies show a broad absorption feature at one micron wavelength that is associated with the presence of magnetite and is what gives the asteroid its blue tint. There are only a few dozens asteroids of this type known to exist.

Rotation period 

In the late 1970s, a rotational lightcurve of Bardwell was obtained by American astronomer Edward Tedesco. It gave a provisional rotation period of 18 hours with a change in brightness of 0.2 magnitude. As of 2017, no other photometric analysis of Bardwell has been made.

Diameter and albedo 

According to the surveys carried out by the Infrared Astronomical Satellite IRAS and NASA's Wide-field Infrared Survey Explorer with its subsequent NEOWISE mission, Bardwell measures between 21.92 and 31.58 kilometers in diameter, and its surface has an albedo between 0.049 and 0.09. The Collaborative Asteroid Lightcurve Link agrees with the results obtained by IRAS, that is, an albedo of 0.0642 and a diameter of 27.78 kilometers based on an absolute magnitude of 11.38.

Notes

References

External links 
 Asteroid Lightcurve Database (LCDB), query form (info )
 Dictionary of Minor Planet Names, Google books
 Asteroids and comets rotation curves, CdR – Observatoire de Genève, Raoul Behrend
 Discovery Circumstances: Numbered Minor Planets (1)-(5000) – Minor Planet Center
 
 

001615
001615
Named minor planets
001615
19500128